The Canadian province of Saskatchewan first required its residents to register their motor vehicles in 1906. Registrants provided their own licence plates for display until 1912, when the province began to issue plates.

, plates are issued by Saskatchewan Government Insurance. Only rear plates have been required since June 30, 2004.

Passenger baseplates

1912 to 1976
The 1954 (dated 1955) issue was the first Saskatchewan licence plate that complied with these standards.

1977 to present
, Saskatchewan is one of five provinces/territories in which decals are not used to show that the vehicle has valid registration (the others being Quebec, Manitoba, Alberta, and the Northwest Territories).

Non-Passenger baseplates

Specialty plates

Military Plates

References

External links

Saskatchewan licence plates, 1969–present

Saskatchewan
Transport in Saskatchewan
Saskatchewan-related lists
1912 establishments in Saskatchewan